Bijli Ghar (بجلی گھر) (Bijligar) or (Bijlee Ghar) is a densely-populated neighbourhood and union council in Mardan District of Khyber Pakhtunkhwa, Pakistan. It is surrounded by canals to the west and the north. Bijli Ghar has a busy market on Nisata road with multiple facilities available.

Education
 Government Girls Primary School Bijli Ghar, Mardan
 Government Middle School Bijli Ghar, Mardan
 Government Primary School Bijli Ghar, Mardan
 Government Girls Middle School Bijli Ghar, MARDAN, Mardan
 Pak Pioneer Model School Bijli Ghar Mardan
 Sher Shah Suri School & College Mardan

Popular Political Parties
 Pakistan Tehreek-e-Insaf
 Awami National Party

Notable Person
 Khursheed Khan (actor)
 Sajjad Khwaraki (cricketer)

References

External links 

Populated places in Mardan District